The 1938 French Grand Prix (formally the XXXII Grand Prix de l'Automobile Club de France) was a Grand Prix motor race which was held at Reims-Gueux on 3 July 1938.

Like the other races in the 1938 European Drivers' Championship, the French Grand Prix was held to new regulations for 1938, mandating a maximum engine capacity of 4.5L, or 3L for supercharged engines, as well as minimum weights based on a sliding scale depending on engine size, with the largest engine cars needing to weigh at least .

Classification

References

French Grand Prix
French Grand Prix
Grand Prix
1938 in French motorsport